István Szűcs (born 3 May 1985 in Debrecen, Hungary) is a Hungarian footballer who currently plays for Debreceni VSC in the Hungarian Borsodi Liga.

Club career

Debrecen
On 1 May 2012 Szűcs won the Hungarian Cup with Debrecen by beating MTK Budapest on penalty shoot-out in the 2011–12 season. This was the fifth Hungarian Cup trophy for Debrecen.

On 12 May 2012 Szűcs won the Hungarian League title with Debrecen after beating Pécs in the 28th round of the Hungarian League by 4–0 at the Oláh Gábor út Stadium which resulted the sixth Hungarian League title for the Hajdús.

Club statistics

Updated to games played as of 1 December 2013.

External links
HLSZ

References

1985 births
Sportspeople from Debrecen
Living people
Hungarian footballers
Association football central defenders
Debreceni VSC players
Kecskeméti TE players
Békéscsaba 1912 Előre footballers
Nemzeti Bajnokság I players